The Bergtest near Wehlen (literally "hill test near Wehlen") is a traditional sporting event that has taken place annually since 1980, usually on the last Saturday in March, in the East German hills of Saxon Switzerland.

It is a challenging competition walk, during which a height difference of 1,400 metres has to be climbed. There are routes of various lengths between 10 and 36 kilometres, that pass through places of interest in the Elbe Sandstone Mountains.

The organizers are:
 Dresden Hiking and Mountaineering Club (Dresdner Wanderer- und Bergsteigerverein or DWBV,
 WKF Bergfried 91 and
 White and Green Walking Group (Wandergruppe Weiß-Grün)
Until 1990 there was also the firm, VEB Kombinat Robotron.

Route 

 Start at station forecourt in Wehlen,
 Damengrund, Naundorf, Kleiner Bärenstein,
 Thieves' Cave (Diebshöhle) (also:Götzinger Cave), Thürmsdorf,
 Königstein Fortress, Palmschänke, Latz Hut,
 Biela bridge, Quirl,
 Pfaffenstein, Pfaffendorf
 Schöne Aussicht
 Königstein (Saxon Switzerland), ferry,
 Lilienstein,
 Rathen,
 Polenz Valley,
 Hockstein,
 Amselgrund,
 Schwedenlöcher
 Steinerner Tisch and back to Wehlen

External links 
 2005 Report
 2007 Bergtest
 2009 description
 2009 Report (pdf file; 1.45 MB)

Challenge walks
Saxon Switzerland
Annual events in Germany
Walking in Germany
1980 establishments in Germany
Recurring sporting events established in 1980